Philipp Holzmann AG was a German construction company based in Frankfurt am Main.

History

Early years
The company was founded in 1849 by Johann Philipp Holzmann (1805-1870) at Sprendlingen in present-day Dreieich near Frankfurt am Main as Philipp Holzmann & Cie. Initially, the former sawmill company was concentrating on the supply of ties for railway construction, but then began to expand into building construction and civil engineering. In 1856, the headquarters moved to Frankfurt where in the late 19th century the company experienced rapid growth.

The first large building contract to be finished was the opera house completed in 1880, followed by the central station in Frankfurt am Main completed in 1888 and the Amsterdam Centraal railway station in 1889. Holzmann also built the original Reichstag building completed in 1894, the Hamburg city hall completed in 1897 and several railway projects in East Africa and Asia, especially the Bagdadbahn built from 1903 which incorporates the Istanbul Haydarpaşa railway station finished in 1908, as well as the Varda Viaduct at Taurus Mountains in southern Turkey completed in 1916. Furthermore, the company participated in the construction of the Elbe Tunnel of 1911 and the Hindenburgdamm completed in 1927, and also the modernist Riederwald housing estate in Frankfurt.

In 1917, Philipp Holzmann & Cie merged with the Internationale Baugesellschaft and became the publicly traded Philipp Holzmann Aktiengesellschaft. In 1938, the company had 20,800 employees and contributed to several major building projects like the new Reich Chancellery in Berlin, the Nazi party rally grounds in Nürnberg, the Prora complex as well as the Westwall and numerous sections of the Reichsautobahn. In World War II, Holzmann constructed large parts of the Atlantic Wall by order of the Organisation Todt.

Post-war years
In the post-war period, the company soon recovered with the rebuilding of Frankfurt, the airport and several public infrastructure projects. Post-war projects included the General Rafael Urdaneta Bridge in Venezuela completed in 1962, the AfE-Turm in Frankfurt completed in 1972, the Westend Gate in Frankfurt completed in 1976, the Eurotower in Frankfurt completed in 1977 and the Silberturm in Frankfurt completed in 1978. These projects enabled Holzmann to expand into the United States and in 1979 it acquired J.A. Jones Construction, a major US contractor.

More recent major projects involving Holzmann included the Frankfurter Büro Center in Frankfurt completed in 1980, the Eurotheum in Frankfurt completed in 1999, the Main Tower in Frankfurt completed in 2000, the Trianon in Frankfurt completed in 2003 and the Western Scheldt Tunnel in the Netherlands also completed in 2003.

Decline
At its peak in 1994, the company had 43,000 employees and was with a revenue of 13.1 billion DM the largest German construction company. Despite public efforts for a recapitalization, the company filed for insolvency in 1999 and was finally liquidated in 2002.

References

Sources

External links
Former official Philipp Holzmann website
 

Defunct construction and civil engineering companies
Construction and civil engineering companies of Germany
Defunct companies of Germany
Companies based in Frankfurt
Design companies established in 1849
German companies established in 1849
Companies involved in the Holocaust
Construction and civil engineering companies established in 1849
Construction and civil engineering companies disestablished in 2002
German companies disestablished in 2002